The 2000 International League season took place from April to September 2000.

The Indianapolis Indians defeated the Scranton/Wilkes-Barre Red Barons to win the league championship.

Attendance
Buffalo Bisons - 678,356
Charlotte Knights - 338,928
Columbus Clippers - 458,806
Durham Bulls - 483,843
Indianapolis Indians - 672,209
Louisville Bats - 685,863
Norfolk Tides - 479,741
Ottawa Lynx - 135,683
Pawtucket Red Sox - 585,107
Richmond Braves - 451,479
Rochester Red Wings - 459,494
Scranton/Wilkes-Barre Red Barons - 470,974
Syracuse Chiefs - 402,450
Toledo Mud Hens - 298,564

Playoffs

Division series

North Division Champion Buffalo (86-59) faced Wild Card winner, Scranton (85-60). Winner: Scranton

South Division Champion Durham (81-62) faced West Division Champion Indianapolis (81-63). Winner: Indianapolis

Championship series
The Indianapolis Indians defeated the Scranton Wilkes-Barre Red Barons.

Indianapolis faced the Memphis Redbirds from the Pacific Coast League in the Triple-A World Series.

Indianapolis won the series 3 games to one. This would be the last World Series held until 2006 when the two league agreed on a one game playoff to determine the Triple A Champion.

References

External links
International League official website 

 
International League seasons